Lajos Erős (born 28 May 1964) is a Hungarian boxer. He competed in the men's light heavyweight event at the 1988 Summer Olympics.

References

External links
 

1964 births
Living people
Hungarian male boxers
Olympic boxers of Hungary
Boxers at the 1988 Summer Olympics
People from Bonyhád
Light-heavyweight boxers
Sportspeople from Tolna County
20th-century Hungarian people